Lorin Blodget (May 23, 1823 in  Busti, Chautauqua County, New York – 1901), American physicist and writer.  Blodget was born near Jamestown and attended the Jamestown Academy.  He later attended a college now called Hobart College in Geneva, NY.

In 1851, he became assistant professor at the Smithsonian Institution at Washington. He may be said to have laid the foundation of American climatology.  In 1855, he published a quarto volume of climatological observations, and in 1857 Climatology of the United States, a work extensively circulated and very favorably received in Europe.  He was editor of the North American, published in Philadelphia, and secretary of the Philadelphia Board of Trade from 1858 to 1864. He contributed articles on finance to the North American Review in 1866 and 1867, besides making contributions to various other publications.

Besides his work for the Smithsonian, Blodget worked for the War Department to conduct climatological research.  Afterward, he worked for the Treasury Department, preparing statistical and financial reports, and later working in specialized positions in the Customs and Treasury Department.  Subsequently, he moved to Philadelphia to become the secretary of the Board of Trade and editor of the "North American Review." He was elected to the American Philosophical Society in 1872.

References

Thompson, Kenneth. "The question of climatic stability in America before 1900", Climatic Change, Vol. 3, No. 3, September, 1981. 
This article incorporates text from the Universal Cyclopædia & Atlas, 1902, New York, D. Appleton & Co., a publication now in the public domain.

External links
 Lorin Blodget On the climatic conditions of the summer of 1853, most directly affecting its sanatary (sic) character (New York, 1853).
 Lorin Blodget Climatology of the United States: And of the Temperate Latitudes of the North American Continent : Embracing a Full Comparison of These with the Climatology of the Temperate Latitudes of Europe and Asia. (Philadelphia, 1857).

1823 births
1901 deaths
People from Chautauqua County, New York
American physicists
American climatologists
Scientists from New York (state)